Keo Sokngon (born 30 April 1988) is a retired Cambodian footballer who is currently serving as team manager of Phnom Penh Crown in the Cambodian League  . He played as a striker or midfielder for his club and the Cambodia national football team. His younger brother, Keo Sokpheng, is also a footballer.

Biography
Sokngon was born to a Chinese Cambodian father and a Vietnamese mother, who was born in Tây Ninh Province. Keo Sokngon moved to Vietnam to live with his family when he was 3 years old and learnt Vietnamese from his mother.

After returning to Cambodia, Sokngon joined Phnom Penh Crown. As a striker, he scored 12 goals in 2009, significantly contributing to the 2009 Cambodian League championship of Phnom Penh Crown. Soon after, he was called to Cambodia national under-23 football team participate at 2009 Southeast Asian Games Football Tournament. He spent one season with Samut Sakhon in Thailand where he received the best player award of the division. When he came back to Cambodia, he signed a contract with the newcomer of the league, Boeung Ket Angkor (formerly known as Boeung Ket Rubber Field FC) and won the league at that time.
On 23 June 2015, he signed with Phnom Penh Crown once again as well as his younger brother, Keo Sokpheng.

After the 2017 Cambodian League season Sokngon was forced to step away from and eventually retire from Football prematurely due to a long term knee injury. Before the beginning of the 2019 Cambodian League season he was announced as Phnom Penh Crown FC's new team manager along with a number of new coaching staffs including head coach Leonardo Vitorino, assistant coach Sum Vanna, goalkeeping coach Fernando Vitorino and general manager Ly Heang.

International goals
Scores and results list Cambodia's goal tally first.

Honours

Player
Phnom Penh Crown
Cambodian League: 2008, 2010, 2015
Hun Sen Cup: 2008, 2009
Boeung Ket Rubber Field
Cambodian League: 2012

Manager 
Phnom Penh Crown

 Cambodian League Cup: 2022
 Cambodian Super Cup: 2022

Individual
2011 Regional League Division 2 Most Valuable Player
2012 Cambodian League Most Valuable Player

References

External links
 
 

1992 births
Living people
Cambodian footballers
Cambodia international footballers
Cambodian sportspeople of Chinese descent
Cambodian people of Vietnamese descent
Sportspeople of Vietnamese descent
People from Kratié province
Boeung Ket Rubber Field players
Association football forwards
Phnom Penh Crown FC players